Argyle is a historic house on a former sugarcane plantation in Houma, Louisiana. It was built circa 1906 for Phelin Bonvillain, a sugar planter. It belongs to the Ingram family since 1947.

The house was designed in the Eastlake architectural style, with "a few Colonial Revival features." It has been listed on the National Register of Historic Places since July 1, 1994.

References

	
National Register of Historic Places in Terrebonne Parish, Louisiana
Queen Anne architecture in Louisiana
Colonial Revival architecture in Louisiana
Houses completed in 1906
Plantation houses in Louisiana
1906 establishments in Louisiana